Solid nitrogen is a number of solid forms of the element nitrogen, first observed in 1884. Solid nitrogen is mainly the subject of academic research, but low-temperature, low-pressure solid nitrogen is a substantial component of bodies in the outer Solar System and high-temperature, high-pressure solid nitrogen is a powerful explosive, with higher energy density than any other non-nuclear material.

Generation 
Karol Olszewski first observed solid nitrogen in 1884, by first liquefying hydrogen with evaporating liquid nitrogen, and then allowing the liquid hydrogen to freeze the nitrogen.

Modern techniques usually take a similar approach: solid nitrogen is normally made in a laboratory by evaporating liquid nitrogen in a vacuum.  The solid produced is porous.

Occurrence in nature 
Solid nitrogen forms a large part of the surface of Pluto (where it mixes with solid carbon monoxide and methane) and the Neptunian moon Triton. On Pluto it was directly observed for the first time in July 2015 by the New Horizons space probe and on Triton it was directly observed by the Voyager 2 space probe in August 1989.Solid nitrogen has several properties relevant to its formation of rocks in the outer Solar System. Even at the low temperatures of solid nitrogen it is fairly volatile and can sublime to form an atmosphere, or condense back into nitrogen frost. Compared to other materials, solid nitrogen loses cohesion at low pressures and flows in the form of glaciers when amassed. Yet its density is higher than that of water ice, so the forces of buoyancy will naturally transport blocks of water ice towards the surface. Indeed, New Horizons observed "floating" water ice atop nitrogen ice on the surface of Pluto.

On Triton, solid nitrogen takes the form of frost crystals and a transparent sheet layer of annealed nitrogen ice, often referred to as a "glaze". Geysers of nitrogen gas were observed by Voyager 2 to spew from the subpolar regions around Triton's southern polar ice cap. A possible explanation of this observed phenomenon is that the sun shines through the transparent layer of nitrogen ice, heating the layers beneath. Nitrogen sublimes and eventually erupts through holes in the upper layer, carrying dust along with it and creating dark streaks.

Transitions to fluid allotropes

Melting 

Like most substances, nitrogen melts at a higher temperature with increasing ambient pressure until , when liquid nitrogen is predicted to polymerize. Above , the melting point drops.

Sublimation
At these low pressures, nitrogen exists in only two known allotropes: α-nitrogen (below ) and β-nitrogen. Measurements of the vapour pressure from  suggest the following empirical formulae:

Solubility in common cryogens 
Solid nitrogen is slightly soluble in liquid hydrogen. Based on solubility in  gaseous hydrogen, Seidal et al. estimated that liquid hydrogen at  can dissolve . At the boiling point of hydrogen with excess solid nitrogen, the dissolved molar fraction is 10−8.

Crystal structure

Dinitrogen crystals 
At ambient and moderate pressures, nitrogen forms  molecules; at low temperature London dispersion forces suffice to solidify these molecules.

α and β 
Solid nitrogen admits two phases at ambient pressure: α- and β-nitrogen.

Below , nitrogen adopts a cubic structure with space group Pa3; the  molecules are located on the body diagonals of the unit cell cube.

Above  (until it melts), nitrogen adopts a hexagonal close packed structure, with unit cell ratio . At higher pressures, the  displays practically no variation.

γ

The space group of the γ phase is P42/mnm.

The nitrogen molecules themselves are arranged in P42/mnm pattern f and take the shape of a prolate spheroid with long dimension  and diameter .

δ, δloc, and ε 
At high pressure (but ambient temperature), dinitrogen adopts the cubic δ form, with space group pm3n and eight molecules per unit cell.

Within the lattice cells, the molecules themselves have disordered orientation, but increases in pressure causes a phase transition to a slightly different phase, δloc, in which the molecular orientations progressively order, a distinction that is only visible via Raman spectroscopy. At high pressure (roughly ) and low temperature, the dinitrogen molecule orientations fully order into the rhombohedral ε phase, which follows space group Rc.

Dissolved  can stabilize ε- at higher temperatures or lower pressures from transforming into δ- (see ).

ζ
Above , ε- transforms to an orthorhombic phase designated by ζ- with a  reduction in volume. The space group of ζ- is P2221.

θ and ι 
Further compression and heating produces two crystalline phases of nitrogen with surprising metastability.

The space group is P21/c and the unit cell contains 48  molecules arranged into a layered structure.

"Black phosphorus" nitrogen
When compressing nitrogen to pressures  and temperatures above , nitrogen adopts a crystal structure ("bp-N") identical to that of black phosphorus (orthorhombic, Cmce space group). Like black phosphorus, bp-N is an electrical conductor. The existence of bp-N structure matches the behavior of heavier pnictogens, and reaffirms the trend that elements at high pressure adopt the same structures as heavier congeners at lower pressures.

Oligomer crystals

Hexagonal layered polymeric nitrogen 
It adopts a tetragonal unit cell (P42bc) in which the single-bonded nitrogen atoms form two layers of interconnected  hexagons. HPL-N is metastable to at least 66 GPa.

Linear forms (N6 and N8)

The decomposition of hydrazinium azide at high pressure and low temperature produces a molecular solid made of linear chains of 8 nitrogen atoms.  Simulations suggest that  is stable at low temperatures and pressures (< 20 GPa); in practice, the reported  decomposes to the ε allotrope below 25 GPa but a residue remains at pressure as low as 3 GPa.  
Grechner et al. predicted in 2016 that an analogous allotrope with six nitrogens should exist at ambient conditions.

Amorphous and network allotropes 
Non-molecular forms of solid nitrogen exhibit the highest known non-nuclear energy density.

μ
When the ζ-N2 phase is compressed at room temperature over  an amorphous form is produced. This is a narrow gap semiconductor, and designated the μ-phase.

η
η-N is a semiconducting amorphous form of nitrogen. In reflected light it appears black, but does transmit some red or yellow light.

Cubic gauche
Each unit cell has edge length , and contains eight nitrogen atoms. As a network, cg-N consists of fused rings of nitrogen atoms; at each atom, the bond angles are very close to tetrahedral. The position of the lone pairs of electrons is ranged so that their overlap is minimised.

The cubic-gauche structure for nitrogen is predicted to have bond lengths of 1.40 Å, bond angles of 114.0° and dihedral angles of −106.8°. The term gauche refers to the odd dihedral angles, if it were 0° it would be called cis, and if 180° it would be called trans. The dihedral angle Φ is related to the bond angle θ by sec(Φ) = sec(θ) − 1. The coordinate of one atom in the unit cell at x,x,x also determines the bond angle by cos(θ) = x(x-1/4)/(x2+(x-1/4)2).

This suggests that all bonds have the same order: a single bond carrying . In contrast, the triple bond in gaseous nitrogen carries only , so that relaxation to the gaseous form involves tremendous energy release: more than any other non-nuclear reaction. For this reason, cubic-gauche nitrogen is being investigated for use in explosives and rocket fuel. Estimates of its energy density vary: simulations predict  is predicted, which is  the energy density of HMX.

Poly-N
Another network solid nitrogen called poly-N and abbreviated pN was predicted in 2006. pN has space group C2/c and cell dimensions a = 5.49 Å, β = 87.68°.  Other higher pressure polymeric forms are predicted in theory, and a metallic form is expected if the pressure is high enough.

Others
Yet other phases of solid dinitrogen are termed ζ'-N2 and κ-N2.

Bulk properties 
At  the ultimate compressive strength is 0.24 MPa. Strength increases as temperature lowers becoming 0.54 MPa at 40.6 K. Elastic modulus varies from 161 to 225 MPa over the same range.

The thermal conductivity of solid nitrogen is 0.7 W m−1 K−1. Thermal conductivity varies with temperature and the relation is given by k = 0.1802×T0.1041  W m−1 K−1. Specific heat is given by 926.91×e0.0093T joules per kilogram per kelvin.
Its appearance at 50 K is transparent, while at 20 K it is white.

Nitrogen frost has a density of 0.85 g cm−3. As a bulk material the crystals are pressed together and density is near that of water.  It is temperature dependent and given by ρ = 0.0134T2 − 0.6981T + 1038.1 kg/m3. The volume coefficient of expansion is given by 2×10−6T2 − 0.0002T + 0.006 K−1.

The index of refraction at 6328 Å is 1.25 and hardly varies with temperature.

The speed of sound in solid nitrogen is 1452 m/s at 20 K and 1222 m/s at 44 K. The longitudinal velocity ranges from 1850 m/s at 5 K to 1700 m/s at 35 K. With temperature rise the nitrogen changes phase and the longitudinal velocity drops rapidly over a small temperature range to below 1600 m/s and then it slowly drops to 1400 m/s near the melting point. The transverse velocity is much lower ranging from 900 to 800 m/s over the same temperature range.

The bulk modulus of s-N2 is 2.16 GPa at 20 K, and 1.47 GPa at 44 K. At temperatures below 30 K solid nitrogen will undergo brittle failure, particularly if strain is applied quickly. Above this temperature the failure mode is ductile failure. Dropping 10 K makes the solid nitrogen 10 times as stiff.

Related substances
Under pressure nitrogen can form crystalline van der Waals compounds with other molecules. It can form an orthorhombic phase with methane above 5 GPa. With helium He(N2)11 is formed. N2 crystallizes with water in nitrogen clathrate and in a mixture with oxygen O2 and water in air clathrate.

Helium
Solid nitrogen can dissolve 2 mole % helium under pressure in its disordered phases such as the γ-phase.  Under higher pressure 9 mol% helium, He can react with ε-nitrogen to form a hexagonal birefringent crystalline van der Waals compound. The unit cell contains 22 nitrogen atoms and 2 helium atoms. It has a volume of 580 Å3 for a pressure of 11 GPa decreasing to 515 Å3 at 14 GPa. It resembles the ε-phase. At 14.5 GPa and 295 K the unit cell has space group P63/m and a=7.936 Å c=9.360 Å. At 28 GPa a transition happens in which the orientation of N2 molecules becomes more ordered. When the pressure on He(N2)11 exceeds 135 GPa the substance changes from clear to black, and takes on an amorphous form similar to η-N2.

Methane
Solid nitrogen can crystallise with some solid methane included. At 55 K the molar percentage can range up to 16.35% CH4, and at 40 K only 5%. In the complementary situation, solid methane can include some nitrogen in its crystals, up to 17.31% nitrogen. As the temperature drops, less methane can dissolve in solid nitrogen, and in α-N2 there is a major drop in methane solubility. These mixtures are prevalent in outer Solar System objects such as Pluto that have both nitrogen and methane on their surfaces. At room temperature there is a clathrate of methane and nitrogen in 1:1 ratio formed at pressures over 5.6 GPa.

Carbon monoxide
The carbon monoxide molecule (CO) is very similar to dinitrogen in size, and it can mix in all proportions with solid nitrogen without changing crystal structure. Carbon monoxide is also found on the surfaces of Pluto and Triton at levels below 1%. Variations in the infrared linewidth of carbon monoxide absorption can reveal the concentration.

Noble gases
Neon or xenon atoms can also be included in solid nitrogen in the β and δ phases. Inclusion of neon pushes the β−δ phase boundary to higher pressures. Argon is also very miscible in solid nitrogen. For compositions of argon and nitrogen with 60% to 70% nitrogen, the hexagonal form remains stable to 0 K. A van der Waals compound of xenon and nitrogen exists above 5.3 GPa. A van der Waals compound of neon and nitrogen was shown using Raman spectroscopy. The compound has formula (N2)6Ne7. It has a hexagonal structure, with a=14.400 c=8.0940 at a pressure of 8 GPa. A van der Waals compound with argon is not known.

Hydrogen
With dideuterium, a clathrate (N2)12D2 exits around 70 GPa.

Oxygen
Solid nitrogen can take up to a one fifth substitution by oxygen O2 and still keep the same crystal structure. δ-N2 can be substituted by up to 95% O2 and retain the same structure. Solid O2 can only have a solid solution of 5% or less of N2.

Use
Solid nitrogen is used in a slush mixture with liquid nitrogen in order to cool faster than with liquid nitrogen alone, useful for applications such as sperm cryopreservation. The semi-solid mixture can also be called slush nitrogen or SN2.

Solid nitrogen is used as a matrix on which to store and study reactive chemical species, such as free radicals or isolated atoms. One use is to study dinitrogen complexes of metals in isolation from other molecules.

Reactions 
When solid nitrogen is irradiated by high speed protons or electrons, several reactive radicals are formed, including atomic nitrogen (N), nitrogen cations (N+), dinitrogen cation (N2+), trinitrogen radicals (N3 and N3+), and azide (N3−).

Notes

References

External links
 
 Jessica Orwig: Freezing Liquid Nitrogen Creates Something Amazing. On: BusinessInsider. Jan 28, 2015 - Videos of nitrogen boiling, freezing, and spontaneously changing crystal form.
 Xiaoli Wang, J. Li, N. Xu et al. (2015): Layered polymeric nitrogen in RbN3 at high pressures. In: Scientific Reports volume 5, Article number: 16677. doi:10.1038/srep16677.

Nitrogen
Allotropes of nitrogen
Pnictogens
Diatomic nonmetals
Ice